Sedat Şahintürk (born 7 February 1996) is a Turkish professional footballer who plays as a left midfielder for Bandırmaspor on loan from Adana Demirspor.

Club career
Şahintürk started off his youth career with a two-year spell with Kocaeli Büyükşehir, which preceded moves to Osmanlıspor, Üçyoldoğuspor and Kocaeli 1937 between 2008 and 2013. In 2013, he was signed by Beşiktaş. Şahintürk made his senior debut for the Süper Lig side in November 2016, featuring for seventy-two minutes of a victory away to Darıca Gençlerbirliği in the Turkish Cup. He featured in a later Group D match against fellow Süper Lig outfit Kayserispor on 26 January 2017, scoring the club's goal in a 1–1 draw. Nine months later, in September, Şahintürk was loaned out to Balıkesirspor of the TFF First League.

He netted on his debut when he scored an eighty-seventh minute winner away to Ankaragücü on 9 September. The loan was renewed at the conclusion of the 2017–18 TFF First League campaign.

On 12 July 2019, after renewing his contract until 2022, Beşiktaş announced that Şahintürk was loaned out to newly-promoted Süper Lig team Denizlispor for a year.

International career
In November 2017, Şahintürk was selected for the Turkey U21s by manager Abdullah Ercan. He made his first appearance in a UEFA European Under-21 Championship qualifier against Belgium on 14 November.

Career statistics
.

References

External links

1996 births
Living people
Sportspeople from İzmit
Turkish footballers
Turkey youth international footballers
Association football midfielders
Süper Lig players
TFF First League players
Beşiktaş J.K. footballers
Balıkesirspor footballers
Denizlispor footballers
Adana Demirspor footballers